Woźniak (plural: Woźniakowie; archaic feminine: Woźniakowa) is a Polish surname. It was the tenth most common surname in Poland in 2009. 

Notable people with the Woźniak surname:

 Aleksandra Wozniak (born 1987), Canadian tennis player
 Angela Wozniak (born 1987), New York state assemblywoman 
 Dagmara Wozniak (born 1988), American Olympic fencer
 Daniel Wozniak (athlete), Polish athlete
 Daniel Wozniak (murderer) (born 1984), American convicted murderer
 David Wozniak, Vince Vaughn character in 2013 American comedy-drama Delivery Man
 Doug Wozniak, American politician
 John Wozniak: see John Wozniak (disambiguation)
 Karl-Heinz Wozniak, German slalom canoeist
 Maciej Woźniak (born 2001), Polish football player
 Mariusz Woźniak (1944–2010), Polish diplomat
 Max Wosniak (born 1926), Polish footballer and manager
 Mike Wozniak (born 1979), British comedian 
 Nate Wozniak (born 1994), American football player
 Paulina Woźniak (born 1992), Polish swimmer
 Paweł Woźniak (born 1969), Polish hurdler
 Piotr Woźniak (politician) (born 1956), Polish public servant and geologist
 Piotr Woźniak (researcher) (born 1962), Polish academic, known for the SuperMemo learning system
 Radim Wozniak (born 1978), Czech footballer
 Scott Wozniak (born 1997), American YouTuber
 Steve Wozniak (born 1950), American computer engineer and co-founder of Apple Inc.
 Szymon Woźniak (born 1993), Polish speedway rider
 Tadeusz Woźniak, Polish politician
 Troy Wozniak (born 1978), Australian rugby league player

See also
 
 Wozniacki, a surname
 Vozniak, surname

References

Polish-language surnames
Occupational surnames